David F. Stewart is a United States Army brigadier general who is the Commanding General of the 32nd Army Air and Missile Defense Command since August 2021. Previously, he served as the Deputy Commander for Operations of the United States Army Space and Missile Defense Command from July 2019 to May 2020.

References

External links
 

Year of birth missing (living people)
Living people
Place of birth missing (living people)
United States Army generals